This article shows the rosters of all participating teams at the women's indoor volleyball tournament at the 2005 Mediterranean Games in Almería.















References

External links
 Official website

Mediterranean Games Women's volleyball squads
Volleyball at the 2005 Mediterranean Games